A Knight in Camelot is a 1998 television film starring Whoopi Goldberg and Michael York, directed by Roger Young, and loosely based on Mark Twain's 1889 novel A Connecticut Yankee in King Arthur's Court.  The film was released as part of The Wonderful World of Disney anthology series that featured numerous productions released by the studio.

Filming took place in the county of Northumberland, England, specifically Alnwick Castle (where a 1979 Disney iteration of the story had been filmed) as well as Budapest in Hungary.

Plot
Scientist Vivien Morgan is zapped back to the medieval age and time of King Arthur and Camelot, when her scientific machine malfunctions. She is sent back along with many objects from her desk, including her laptop and boom box. As she is sentenced to be burned at the stake, she discovers among the laptop-data, that there will be a solar eclipse in short time. With her "magical powers" she makes the sun re-appear and is being knighted by King Arthur as Sir Boss and becomes a member of the Knights of the Round Table. She soon begins constructing devices that will not be present for many centuries, she saves the king, defeats Sir Sagramore and saves the day countless times before being zapped back to the present.

Cast
 Whoopi Goldberg as Dr. Vivien Morgan/Sir Boss
 Michael York as King Arthur
 Paloma Baeza as Sandy
 Simon Fenton as Clarence
 James Coombes as Sir Lancelot
 Robert Addie as Sir Sagramore
 Ian Richardson as Merlin
 Amanda Donohoe as Queen Guinevere
 John Guerrasio as Bob
 Steve Speirs as Head of arms

See also
List of films featuring eclipses

External links
 
 

American television films
Arthurian films
Films based on American novels
1998 television films
1998 films
Films based on A Connecticut Yankee in King Arthur's Court
Films directed by Roger Young
American fantasy comedy films
Films shot in Budapest
Films shot in Northumberland
1990s English-language films
Television shows based on works by Mark Twain
1990s American films